Scotch Irish Township is one of fourteen townships in Rowan County, North Carolina, United States. The township had a population of 1,820 according to the 2010 census.  By the requirements of the North Carolina Constitution of 1868, all counties in North Carolina were divided into townships.

Geographically, Scotch Irish Township occupies  in northwestern Rowan County.  There are no incorporated municipalities in Scotch Irish Township.  The township's northern boundary is the South Yadkin River and borders with Davie County and its western border is with Cool Springs Township, Iredell County.

Residents are served by the Rowan–Salisbury School System.

Current and historical sites and people

The following sites are within Scotch Irish Township:
 Alpha Post Office, Carson A. Guffy postmaster, 6/19/1884 to 2/29/1904
 Baker's Mill
 Campbell's Bridge
 Desciples Church
 James Graham Ramsay, physician, farmer and North Carolina politician
 Keaton's Barbecue
 Moores Chapel
 Mount Vernon Plantation (historic plantation built in 1822)
 Piny Grove School
 Restoration Church
 Rock Hill School
 Scotch Irish School
 Teague School
 Village of Mt. Vernon
 Village of Pittsburg (first noted in 1882)
 South River Church and School

Township maps also depict several colored schools in Scotch Irish Township in 1903 and 1930.  The Rowan Mills Post Office was used in the enumeration of residents of Scotch Irish Township in 1870.

Adjacent townships
Calahaln Township, Davie County – north
Cleveland – south
Cool Springs – west
Turnersburg – northwest
Unity – east

References

Townships in Rowan County, North Carolina
Scotch-Irish American culture in North Carolina
Townships in North Carolina